Rex Selwyn Fell ( – 22 April 2016) was a New Zealand breeder of Thoroughbred racehorses.

Fell was one of twin sons born to Arthur Fell, founder of Fairdale Stud at Longburn, and his wife Joan. His greatest success as a breeder came with the gelding Hyperno, winner of the 1979 Melbourne Cup and other group and listed races. After a 45-year partnership in Fairdale Stud with his father Arthur and brother Gerald, Fell established Goodwood Stud with his son, William, in 2007.

As well as being a breeder, Fell was involved in horseracing administration, serving as the president of the Manawatu Racing Club.

Fell died at Palmerston North on 22 April 2016, aged 71.

References

1940s births
2016 deaths
People from Manawatū-Whanganui
New Zealand racehorse owners and breeders
New Zealand sports executives and administrators